Obery Farms was founded in 1874 with only 127 acres. The Obery family has been farming in rural Metamora, Illinois for six generations and over 140 years. Today, the family farms over 3,000 acres in Central Illinois.

Documentary
In 2009, a 33-minute documentary on Obery Farms was produced by award-winning filmmaker Levi Obery and Ten Thirty-One Pictures Entertainment. The film won a 2009 Davey Award and a 2010 Communicator Award. It aired on the Documentary Channel on DirecTV and Dish Network and was also released on DVD and Blu-ray.

References

1874 establishments in Illinois
Companies based in Woodford County, Illinois
Food and drink companies established in 1874
Farms in Illinois
Privately held companies based in Illinois
Agriculture companies of the United States